Terry Morrissey (7 December 1944 – 29 May 2020) was an Australian rules footballer who played with Richmond in the Victorian Football League (VFL).

Notes

External links  
 

Profile from Tigerland Archive

  
1944 births 
Australian rules footballers from Victoria (Australia) 
Richmond Football Club players
Port Fairy Football Club players
2020 deaths